Peter J. Blenkinsop, S.J. (April 19, 1818November 5, 1896) was an Irish-American Catholic priest and Jesuit who was the president of the College of the Holy Cross from 1854 to 1857. After emigrating to the United States in 1826, he entered the Society of Jesus and studied for the priesthood. After the end of his presidency, he engaged in pastoral work in the Northeastern United States.

Early life 
Peter J. Blenkinsop was born on April 19, 1818 in Dublin, Ireland. He emigrated with his family to the United States in 1826 and enrolled at the preparatory division of St. Mary's College in Baltimore, Maryland, in 1830. In 1834, he entered the Society of Jesus and began his study of philosophy and theology at Georgetown College in 1838. His sister, Euphemia, would become the superior of the Sisters of Charity in Emmitsburg, Maryland.

At Georgetown, Blenkinsop also taught ethics. He was ordained a priest by Archbishop Samuel Eccleston of Baltimore on July 26, 1846.

Holy Cross 
Blenkinsop became the treasurer of the College of the Holy Cross in 1847. He remained in this position until his appointment as the president of the College of the Holy Cross on August 13, 1854, succeeding Anthony F. Ciampi. The college had been nearly completely destroyed by a fire on July 14, 1852, and continued the work of Ciampi to offset the significant financial costs of the rebuilding that occurred during his predecessor. During his tenure, the college also struggled to increase enrollment. His term as president came to an end in 1857, and Ciampi once again became president of the school.

Later years 
After leaving Holy Cross, Blenkinsop spent the rest of career engaged in pastoral work. He was stationed at Jesuit churches in Massachusetts, Pennsylvania, and Maryland, including for a time as pastor of St. John the Evangelist Church in Frederick, Maryland, and Old St. Joseph's Church in Philadelphia, Pennsylvania. He also spent time at the College of the Holy Cross, Georgetown College, and Saint Joseph's College.

Blenkinsop died on November 5, 1896, at the Church of the Gesú in Philadelphia.

References

Citations

Sources 

 

1818 births
1896 deaths
Christian clergy from Dublin (city)
19th-century American Jesuits
St. Mary's Seminary and University alumni
Georgetown College (Georgetown University) alumni
Presidents of the College of the Holy Cross